The East Side Mall is a shopping mall in the Berlin-Friedrichshain district of Berlin, Germany. The mall was designed by architect Ben van Berkel. Construction began in May 2016 and was opened to the public in October 2018.

See also
 List of shopping malls in Germany

Shopping malls in Berlin